The Book of Lamentations is part of the Old Testament or Pentateuch.

Lamentations may also refer to:
 Lamentations (Solstice album), a 1994 album by British doom metal band Solstice
 Lamentations (Ngaiire album), a 2014 album by Australian artist Ngaiire
 Lamentations (Live at Shepherd's Bush Empire 2003), a live DVD by the band Opeth
 "Lamentations of Jeremiah the Prophet" from the celebration of Tenebrae in Roman Catholic and certain other Christian denominations
 The Holy Saturday Lamentation hymns in Eastern Orthodoxy

See also
 Lament (disambiguation)
 Lamentation (disambiguation)
 Laments (Kochanowski) by 16th-century Polish poet Jan Kochanowski